Volveré  is a song previously sung by Diego Verdaguer. It was the first single off the album Pensando En Ti of K-Paz de la Sierra. It was also inspired by the Italian song "Tornero" by I Santo California. It remains their biggest hit to date on Billboard's Hot Latin Tracks chart, where it peaked at #6 in 2004.

References 

Spanish-language songs
2004 singles
Diego Verdaguer songs
2004 songs
Song articles with missing songwriters